P25 may refer to:

 Boulton & Paul P.25 Bugle, a British heavy bomber
 BRM P25, a Formula One racing car
 Honda P25, a moped
 Mabiha language
 P-25 mine, an Italian anti-personnel mine
 Papyrus 25, a biblical manuscript
 Paratech P25, a Swiss paraglider
 Phosphorus-25, an isotope of phosphorus
 Project 25, a telecommunication standard
 Zastava P25, a pistol

See also
25P (disambiguation)